Kaltack is a surname. Notable persons with this name include:
Brian Kaltack (born 1993), Vanuatan footballer
Jean Kaltack (born 1994), Vanuatan footballer, cousin of Brian
Michel Kaltack  (born 1990), Vanuatan footballer
Tony Kaltack (born 1996), Vanuatan footballer, brother of Jean and cousin of Brian